The Hobart Baroque Festival was a Music festival of Baroque music that took place in the city of Hobart, Tasmania. There were two events held under the name. In 2015, the festival was moved to Brisbane as Brisbane Baroque.

2013 festival
The 2013 festival featured performances by Russian soprano Julia Lezhneva and Spanish countertenor Xavier Sabata.

2104 festival
Artists featured in the 2014 festival included Julia Lezhneva.

References

2013 establishments in Australia
2014 disestablishments in Australia
Festivals in Hobart
Music festivals established in 2013

Classical music festivals in Australia